Pseudoterpna simplex is a moth of the family Geometridae first described by Sergei Alphéraky in 1892. It is found in central Asia, including Xinjiang in China.

References

Moths described in 1892
Pseudoterpnini